Giselbert I (died 1013 or 1014), count of Roussillon (991–1013), was the son of Gausfred I.  His father divided his lands between his sons, giving Ampurias to Hugh and Roussillon to Giselbert.

Though the patrimony was divided, both brothers continued to claim and annex territory belonging to the other and war was common, even among their descendants.

In 1013, Giselbert died and Hugh invaded his county.  It was not until 1020 that Hugh was repelled and Gausfred, Giselbert's son, definitively succeeded.

By marriage to Beliarda, he produced three sons:

Gausfred (died 1074), successor
Sunifred (died 1031), bishop of Elna
Berengar (died 1053), bishop of Elna

1013 deaths
Year of birth unknown
10th-century Visigothic people
11th-century Visigothic people